Trichromia carinaria is a moth in the family Erebidae. It was described by William Schaus in 1905. It is found in French Guiana.

References

External links

Moths described in 1905
carinaria